was a Japanese filmmaker, actor, and screenwriter. He is known for his work in several adaptations of Shinji Wada's manga series Sukeban Deka as well as television series and movies from the Metal Hero Series. Tanaka died of stomach cancer on July 9, 2011.

Film
 Ojoosama deka (1993) 
 Sukeban Deka: Kazama Sanshimai no Gyakushuu (1988), aka Girl Gang Boss Detective: Revenge of the Three Kazama Sisters (Japanese informal title) or Sukebandeka the Movie 2: Counter-Attack from the Kazama Sisters (USA: DVD box title)
 Sukeban Deka (1987), aka High School Superheroine (Japan: English title)

TV
 Hana no Asuka gumi (1988), aka Radiant Asuka Class
 Shôjo ninpô-chô denki: Sanshimai Mottomo Kiken na Tabi: Yattsu no Shi no Wana (1987)
 Uchuu Keiji Gavan (1982), aka Space Sheriff Gavan, unknown episodes
 Kaiketsu Zubat (1977), aka Swift Hero Zubat and Vigilante Zubat (literal English title), unknown episodes
 Ninja kyaputaa (1976), aka Ninja Captor (literal English title)

References

External links
 
 

1933 births
2011 deaths
Deaths from stomach cancer
Deaths from cancer in Japan
Japanese film directors
Japanese television directors
Place of birth missing
Aichi University alumni